Any-source multicast (ASM) is the older and more usual form of multicast where multiple senders can be on the same group/channel, as opposed to source-specific multicast where a single particular source is specified.

Any-source multicast allows a host computer to map IPs and then sends IPs to a number of groups via IP address. This method of multicasting allows hosts to transmit to/from groups without any restriction on the location of end-user computers by allowing any receiving host group computer to become a transmission source. Bandwidth usage is nominal allowing Video Conferencing to be used extensively. However, this type of multicast is vulnerable in that it allows for unauthorized traffic and denial-of-service attacks.

Commonly, any-source multicast is used in IGMP version 2; however, it can also be used in PIM-SM, MSDP, and MBGP. ASM utilizes IPv4 in association with the previously stated protocols; in addition, MLDv1 protocol is used for IPv6 addresses.

Benefits 

Scalability for large tasks 
The reduction of group management 
Ability to use existing technologies

See also

IP multicast
Internet Group Management Protocol
RTCP
Xcast

References 

Internet architecture
Internet broadcasting
Internet Protocol
Routing